Sfissifa (Arabic: صفيصيفة) is a municipality in Naâma Province, Algeria. It is coextensive with the district of Sfissifa and has a population of 2,633, which gives it 7 seats in the PMA. Its postal code is 45220 and its municipal code is 4505.

Communes of Naâma Province
Cities in Algeria
Algeria